Middle Point is an administrative locality in the Northern Territory of Australia.

This locality derives its name from the ridge of fertile land sticking 
into the edge of the coastal plains of the Adelaide River.

Some features of this locality are
a CSIRO Research Station,
a school (the Middle Point School),
a Department of Defence Transmitting Station ,
assorted farms,
Harrison Dam , 
Fogg Dam Conservation Reserve
and was the home of the failed Humpty Doo Rice Project .

The 2016 Australian census which was conducted in August 2016 reports that Middle Point had 58 people living within its boundaries.

Middle Point is located within the federal division of Lingiari, the territory electoral division of Goyder and the local government area of the Litchfield Municipality.

References

External links
 Placenames

Suburbs of Darwin, Northern Territory